Lonicera xylosteum, commonly known as fly honeysuckle, European fly honeysuckle, dwarf honeysuckle or fly woodbine is a deciduous shrub.

The glossy red (or occasionally yellow) berries of this shrub are mildly poisonous to humans – children who ingest a large number (c. 30) of berries may experience abdominal pain and vomiting.

References

xylosteum
Flora of Europe
Plants described in 1753
Taxa named by Carl Linnaeus